The 40th Fighter Aviation Regiment (Serbo-Croatian: 40. lovačk4i avijacijski puk / 40. ловачк4и авијацијски пук) was established in 1955 as part of the SFR Yugoslav Air Force. The command of the regiment was stationed at Zagreb airport until it was disbanded in 1959.

History

The 40th Fighter Aviation Regiment was formed on July 7 1955, at Pula Airport from S-49C aircraft of the 185th Aviation Regiment. After it reached its completed establishment, the regiment was re-located to Zagreb Airport where it became part of the 32nd Aviation Division. 

It was disbanded by the beginning of 1959.

Assignments
32nd Aviation Division (1955–1959)

Commanding officers

Equipment
Ikarus S-49C

References

Fighter regiments of the Yugoslav Air Force
Military units and formations established in 1955
Military units and formations disestablished in 1959
1955 establishments in Yugoslavia